Ram Mohan (26 August 1931 – 11 October 2019) was an Indian animator, title designer and design educator, who was also known as father of Indian Animation and was a veteran in the Indian animation industry, who started his career at the Cartoon Films Unit, Films Division of India, Government of India in 1956. He was chairman and chief creative officer at Graphiti Multimedia, a Mumbai-based animation company which was established in 1995, and later he also established the Graphiti School of Animation in 2006.

He had won the National Film Award for Best Non-Feature Animation Film twice, You Said It (1972) and Fire Games (1983). He was awarded a lifetime achievement award at the 2006 Mumbai International Film Festival and was awarded the Padma Shri the fourth-highest civilian award given by Government of India in 2014.

Early life and education
Graduated in Chemistry from the University of Madras and later moved to Mumbai for his post-graduate studies but gave it up to join the Cartoon Films Unit, Films Division, Government of India in 1956. He received training in animation techniques from Clair Weeks of Walt Disney Studios, under the US Technical Aid program. Weeks was at the time serving a two-year stint as the head of the Cartoon Films Unit. Another important person to join at the same time was Bhimsain Khurana, who also became a notable animator (Ek Anek Aur Ekta).

Career
Mohan worked as an animator with the Films division till the late 1960s, and thereafter founded Ram Mohan Biographics, in 1972. It ultimately merged with UTV Toons, a division of United Studios Limited (USL) in 1998.

Mohan started out by doing character design and story boards for This Our India, an animated film adapted from a book by Minoo Masani. He scripted, designed and animated many of Cartoon Film unit's productions from 1960 to 1967, including 'Homo Saps' which won the National Award for Best Experimental Film, 1967, and 'Chaos' which won an Award at the Leipzig Festival of short Films in 1968. He participated in the 1967 world retrospective of Animation Cinema in Montreal.

In 1968 he left Films Division and joined Prasad Productions as chief of their animation division. In 1972, he established his own production company, Ram Mohan Biographics, which worked on commercials, and the animated feature Ramayana: The Legend of Prince Rama (1992), which he co-directed in collaboration with Yugo Sako from Japan.

Ram Mohan's film credits include several animation sequences for mainstream filmmakers – an animated song for B.R. Chopra's Pati Patni Aur Woh (1978), a title sequence for Satyajit Ray's Shatranj Ke Khilari, a sequence for Mrinal Sen's Hindi film, Bhuvan Shome, and for films such as Biwi-O-Biwi, Do Aur Do Paanch and Kaamchor.

Ram Mohan was also responsible for the spread of animation in India. Many of the leading animation professionals active today in India started their careers in his studio.

Death

Ram Mohan died on 11 October 2019 in Mumbai at the age of 88.

Filmography

Awards
 1969– National Award for the Best Film on family planning, "Baap Re Baap".
 1972– National Film Award for Best Non-Feature Animation Film: You Said It
 1974– He was commissioned to script, design and direct a series of educational films on population and environment, "Down to Earth" for the International Planned Parenthood Federation and the Family Planning Association of India.
 1983 – National Award for the Best Animation Film: Fire Games
 1996– Communication Arts Guild Hall of Frame award for Life Time achievement. Series director:“Meena” for UNICEF, a series of 13 episodes dealing with issues concerning the girl child in south Asia.
 2001– Advertising Club Award 'ABBY' for Life Time Achievement.
 2003– I.D.P.A. 'Ezra Mir' award for Life-Time Achievement. Broadcast India
 2014 – Padma Shri, India's 4th highest civilian award by Govt. of India.

References

Bibliography
 Lent, John A. Ram Mohan and RM-USL: India's Change Agents of Animation. Animation World, August 1998. 
 Design In India on Ram Mohan

External links

 Graphiti Multimedia, Official website
 

1931 births
2019 deaths
University of Madras alumni
Film and television title designers
Animation educators
Recipients of the Padma Shri in arts
Indian animators
Indian animated film directors
Indian animated film producers